Confederation of Indian Communist and Democratic Socialists (CICDS) was a confederation of pro- left-wing parties in India.

The constituent parties of CICDS included:
 United Communist Party of India led by Mohit Sen
 Communist Marxist Party (John) led by C. P. John
 Party of Democratic Socialism led by Saifuddin Choudhury and Samir Putatundu
 Communist Revolutionary League of India (CRLI) led by Ashim Chatterjee
 Peoples Revolutionary Party of India (Paschimbanga Ganatantrik Manch) led by Sumantha Hira
 Tripura Ganatantrik Manch led by Ajoy Biswas
 Janganotantrik Morcha
 Marxist Manch of Assam
 Orissa Communist Party led by Ajay Rout
 Krantikari Samyavadi Party based in Bihar
 Rashtravadi Communist Party based in Uttar Pradesh
 Madhya Pradesh Kisan Mazdoor Adivasi Kranti Dal

References

Communism in India
Defunct political party alliances in India
Organizations with year of disestablishment missing
Organizations with year of establishment missing